Gunder is an unincorporated community in Clayton County, Iowa, United States. The Turkey River flows south of Gunder, and Roberts Creek, a tributary, to the north. The county seat of Elkader lies approximately 10 miles to the southeast.

History
Founded in the 1800s, Gunder's population was just 12 in 1902, and was also 12 in 1925.

References

Unincorporated communities in Clayton County, Iowa
Unincorporated communities in Iowa